Nicolas "Nic" Romm (born 1974 in Montreal, Quebec, Canada) is a German actor.

Life and work
After Nic Romm finished the gymnasium in Jülich, a town in the district of Düren, in the federal state of North Rhine-Westphalia, he visited the Hochschule für Musik und Theater Hannover. There he studied acting from 1997 to 2001. During and since his study Nic Romm appeared in several TV movies and -series and films and took part in a few theatre plays.

In 2008 Nic Romm took part in a casting show, which was arranged by German Film director, actor and author Michael Herbig to find suitable actors for his live-action film adaption of Vicky the Viking. The show was broadcast from April 2008 to May 2008 on German TV channel Pro7. Nic Romm won the role of Tjure, a Viking.

Nic Romm lives in Berlin.

Select filmography
1997: Die Nacht der Nächte – School's out (TV movie)
1999: Ein Fall für zwei (TV series)
2000: Crazy
2001: Powder Park
2001: Hostile Takeover (Feindliche Übernahme – Althan.com)
2002: Kolle – Ein Leben für Liebe und Sex (TV movie)
2002: Der Wannsee-Mörder (TV movie)
2002: Sternenfänger (TV series)
2003:  (Suche impotenten Mann fürs Leben)
2003: Die Ritterinnen
2003: 
2003: Wilsberg (TV series)
2005: Die Pathologin - Im Namen der Toten (TV movie)
2005: Stefanie – Eine Frau startet durch (TV series)
2005: Lindenstraße (TV series, appeared in five episodes)
2005: Das Leben der Philosophen (TV movie)
2006: Wortbrot
2006: Eine Krone für Isabell (TV movie)
2006: Schmitz komm raus (TV series, various characters)
2007: Doktor Martin (TV series)
2008: Alarm für Cobra 11 (TV series)
2009: Vicky the Viking (Wickie und die Starken Männer)
2009: Die ProSieben Märchenstunde (TV movie-series)
2011: Vicky and the Treasure of the Gods (Wickie auf grosser fahrt)

Trivia
With film director and actor Daniel Steiner Nic Romm shot a music video for the German musician and singer Namosh.

References

External links
 

1974 births
Living people
German male television actors
German male film actors
German music video directors
People from Jülich